Felipe Ryan Alves Silva (born 28 April 1997), commonly known as Felipe Ryan, is a Brazilian professional footballer who plays for Portuguese club Varzim as a midfielder.

Career statistics

Club

Notes

References

1997 births
Living people
Brazilian footballers
Brazilian expatriate footballers
Association football midfielders
F.C. Barreirense players
Gil Vicente F.C. players
G.D. Vitória de Sernache players
Caldas S.C. players
Académico de Viseu F.C. players
Real S.C. players
F.C. Alverca players
P.O. Xylotymbou players
Varzim S.C. players
Campeonato de Portugal (league) players
Liga Portugal 2 players
Brazilian expatriate sportspeople in Portugal
Brazilian expatriate sportspeople in Cyprus
Expatriate footballers in Portugal
Expatriate footballers in Cyprus